The 1922 confiscation of church property in Russia was held by the Bolshevik government of the Russian Soviet Federative Socialist Republic allegedly to combat the Russian famine of 1921–1922. During 1922, precious metals and gems were removed by state authorities from churches of all denominations. Subject to confiscation or articles intended exclusively for liturgical purposes (holy chalices), which is set in a very vulnerable position of the clergy, and caused the resistance of the congregation. The clergy organized resistance to the removal and vandalization of church property, which was met with brutal repression by the Bolsheviks.

History

On February 5, 1918, the Soviet government issued the Decree on Separation of Church from State and School from Church. According to this document, all property in the Russian Orthodox Church and in other religious organizations, including land, premises, church utensils, was nationalized and became the property of the state. According to the decree, buildings and objects intended specifically for liturgical purposes, were given, under special decrees of local or central state power, to the free use of the respective religious societies. However, believers and the clergy were associated with the White movement and were therefore routinely harassed and repressed against. Some believers tried to resist when representatives of the state confiscated the inventory churches and monasteries. Resistance was crushed, and resistance activists ended up prosecutred (Samarin-Kuznetsov trial). In 1921, famine began in Russia. On February 23, 1922, the All-Russian Central Executive Committee issued a decree «On the Seizure of Church Jewelry». The decree ordered the local organs of Soviet power to remove from the churches all products made of gold, silver and precious stones and transfer them to the Central Fund for the Relief of the Starving. The most famous clashed between the Bolsheviks and resisting clergyman and people occurred in Shuya. Here, a crowd of believers tried not to let the representatives of power seize the church inventory. The authorities opened fire, resulting in 4 people being killed and others severely wounded. After the events in Shuya, trials took place, at which direct participants in the events and Patriarch Tikhon were prosecuted.

The order to seize property was carried out with ruthless violence by Red soldiers. They often opened fire on crowds that surrounded churches in an attempt to defend them and on religious processions in protest against Church persecution. Thousands were killed in this way, especially in the spring of 1918. Shooting down of religious processions are well documented in Voronezh, Shatsk (Tambov province), and Tula (where thirteen were killed and many wounded, including Bishop Kornilii).

According to The New York Times, eight  priests, two laymen and one woman were sentenced to death in Moscow on May 8, 1922, for having opposed the confiscation of religious inventory.

Patriarch Tikhon excommunicated the Soviet leadership on January 19, 1918 (Julian calendar) for conducting this campaign. In retaliation the regime arrested and killed dozens of bishops, thousands of the lower clergy and monastics, and multitudes of laity. The seizing of church property over the next few years would be marked by a brutal campaign of violent terror.

Legacy
The Bolsheviks started a campaign of seizing church property in 1922. In that year over 4.5 million golden roubles of property were seized. Out of these, one million gold roubles were spent for famine relief. In a secret March 19, 1922 letter to the Politburo, Lenin expressed an intention to seize several hundred million golden roubles for famine relief.

In Lenin's secret letter to the Politburo, Lenin explains that the famine provides an opportunity against the church. Richard Pipes argued that the famine was used politically as an excuse for the Bolshevik leadership to persecute the Orthodox Church, which held significant sway over much of the peasant populace.

Notes

References
 Архивы Кремля. Политбюро и Церковь. Книга 1. 1922–1925 гг. Дело №23. «Об изъятии церковных ценностей и колоколов»
 Изъятие церковных ценностей. / Д. Н. Никитин/ Православная энциклопедия  /  Т. 21, С. 661-668
 Кривова Н. А. Власть и Церковь в 1922–1925 гг.
 Кривова Н. А. Декрет ВЦИК об изъятии церковных ценностей: от поисков компромисса к конфронтации. // Международный исторический журнал. — No. 1. — 1999.

Famines in Russia
1922 in the Soviet Union
1921 in Russia
20th-century Eastern Orthodoxy
Russian Orthodox Church in Russia
1922 in Russia
History of the Russian Orthodox Church
Eastern Orthodoxy in the Soviet Union
Anti-religious campaign in the Soviet Union
Anti-Christian sentiment in Europe
1922 in Christianity
Religious persecution by communists
Persecution by atheist states
Government finances in the Soviet Union